Julie McEnery is an astrophysicist at the Goddard Space Flight Center where she is the senior project scientist for the Nancy Grace Roman Space Telescope.  Until 2020 she was the project scientist for the Fermi Gamma-Ray Space Telescope. McEnery received a PhD in Experimental Physics from University College Dublin in 1998. For her PhD, she observed the galaxy Markarian 421. She is a fellow of the American Physical Society, and an adjunct professor of physics at The University of Maryland and George Washington University. McEnery has spoken about how she admires Nancy Roman.

Before working at the Goddard Space Flight Center, McEnery worked on ground based gamma-ray telescopes that detected Cherenkov radiation. She has also worked with the Milagro collaboration on gamma-ray bursts.

In 2018, McEnery was awarded UCD Alumnus of the Year in Research, Innovation & Impact. 

The Julie McEnery Medal and Prize of University College Dublin is awarded in her honor.

See also 
List of women in leadership positions on astronomical instrumentation projects

References 

American astrophysicists
NASA astrophysicists
Living people
Year of birth missing (living people)
American women physicists
Fellows of the American Physical Society
21st-century American women
University System of Maryland alumni
George Washington University alumni